Political cinema, in the narrow sense, refers to cinema products that portray events or social conditions, either current or historical, through a partisan perspective, with the intent of informing or agitating the spectator.

Political cinema exists in different forms, such as documentaries, short films, feature films, experimental films, and even animated cartoons.

Concept
In the narrow sense of the term, political cinema refers to films that do not hide their political stance. In this sense, they differ from other films not because they are political, but because of the way in which their politics is presented. As such, a film does not necessarily have to be pure propaganda to be considered 'political cinema'.

The broader meaning of 'political cinema' is argued to be that "all films are political;" even films that are ostensibly 'apolitical' and escapist, merely promising 'entertainment' as an escape from everyday life, can be understood as fulfilling a political function. The authorities in Nazi Germany, for instance, knew this very well and organized a large production of deliberately escapist films. In other 'entertainment' films, such as westerns, the ideological bias is evident in the distortion of historical reality. A "classical" western would rarely portray black cowboys, although there were a great many of them in the American frontier. Hollywood cinema, which can be understood as the dominant industry of cinema, was often accused of misrepresenting black, female, gay, and working-class people. More fundamentally, not only are the contents of individual films political, but the institution of cinema itself can also be taken as political as well. A huge number of people congregate, not to act together or to talk to each other, but to sit silently, after having paid for it, to be spectators separated from each other. Guy Debord, a critic of the 'society of the spectacle', for whom "separation is the alpha and omega of the spectacle," was therefore also violently opposed to cinema, even though he would make several films portraying his ideas.

In order to differentiate between the narrow and broad notions of 'political cinema', film scholar Ewa Mazierska suggested to divide all such films into the categories of conformist or oppositional and marked or unmarked:

 Conformist films "accept the political status quo;" while oppositional films reject it.
 Marked political films are willing to reveal to their viewers the party/ideology "they serve"; while unmarked films prefer to hide it.

From this point of view, it is the oppositional and marked political films that the most viewers regard as 'political', as discussions about politics in film typically single out these two categories.

History

Cinema, World War I and its aftermath
Before World War I French cinema had a big share of the world market. Hollywood used the collapse of the French production to establish its hegemony. Ever since it has dominated world film production not only economically but has transformed cinema into a means to disseminate American values.

In Germany the Universum Film AG, better known as UFA, was founded to counter the perceived dominance of American propaganda. During the Weimar Republic many films about Frederick II of Prussia had a conservative nationalistic agenda, as Siegfried Kracauer and other film critics noted.

Communists like Willi Münzenberg saw the Russian cinema as a model of political cinema. Soviet films by Sergei Eisenstein, Dziga Vertov and others combined a partisan view of the bolshevist regime with artistic innovation which also appealed to western audiences.

National Socialism

Leni Riefenstahl has never been able or willing to face her responsibility as a chief propagandist for National-Socialism, i.e., Nazism. Almost unlimited resources and her undeniable talent led to results, which, despite their hideous aims, still fascinate some aficionados of film. While there is much controversy around her work, it is generally accepted that Riefenstahl's main commitment was to filmmaking, rather than to the Nazi Party. Proof of this might be seen by the portrayal of Jesse Owens' victory in her film about the 1936 Olympic games in Berlin, Olympia (1938), and in her later work, mostly on her photographic expeditions to Africa.

The same is certainly not true of the violent anti-Semitic films of Fritz Hippler. Other Nazi political films made propaganda for so-called euthanasia.

Third Cinema

Recent films 
Especially in the last decades of the 20th century, many filmmakers considered focusing on remembrance of and reflection upon major collective crimes such as the Holocaust, slavery and disasters such as the Chernobyl disaster to be their political and moral duty.

Globalization and related world issues
Political cinema of the 21st century seems to focus on controversial topics such as globalization, AIDS, and other health-care concerns, issues pertaining to the environment, such as world energy resources and consumption and climate change, and other complex matters pertaining to discrimination, capitalism, terrorism, war, peace, religious and related forms of intolerance, and civil and political rights, as well as other human rights.

Forms
The form has always been an important concern for political filmmakers. While some, like pioneering Lionel Rogosin,  argued that radical films, in order to liberate the imagination of the spectator, have to break not only with the content but also with the form of Dominant cinema, the falsely reassuring clichés and stereotypes of conventional narrative film making, other directors such as Francesco Rosi, Costa Gavras, Ken Loach, Oliver Stone, Spike Lee or Lina Wertmüller preferred to work within mainstream cinema to reach a wider audience.

The subversive tradition dates back at least to the French avant-garde of the 1920s. Even in his more conventional films Luis Buñuel stuck to the spirit of outright revolt of L'Âge d'or. The bourgeoisie had to be expropriated and all its values destroyed, the surrealists believed. This spirit of revolt is also present in all films of Jean Vigo.

Selected filmography
 The following is a listing of notable political films or political films made by notable directors:

See also

Political films category
Cultural industry
African cinema
Documentary film
List of racism-related films
List of films dealing with Anarchism
Social criticism
Women's cinema

References

Bibliography
Baldwin, James. [1976] 2000. The Devil Finds Work. New York: Delta Trade Paperbacks (Dell Publishing). .
Barnouw, Erik. 1993. Documentary: A History of the Non-Fiction Film (2nd ed.). New York: Oxford UP. . (A useful introduction.)
Barsam, Richard M. 2003. Looking at Movies: An Introduction to Film. New York: W. W. Norton & Company. . (Book and CD-ROM eds.)
Daressa, Larry. 2008 May 10. "The Political Film and Its Audience in the Digital Age: Newsreel at Forty And Zero." California Newsreel.
Rosenbaum, Jonathan. 1997. Movies as Politics. University of California Press. .
Unterburger, Amy L., ed. 1999. The St. James Women Filmmakers Encyclopedia: Women on the Other Side of the Camera. Detroit: Visible Ink Press. .
Vogel, Amos. 2006. Film as a Subversive Art. London: CT Editions. .
 Zaniello, Tom. 2003. Working Stiffs, Union Maids, Reds, and Riffraff: An Expanded Guide to Films about Labor. Cornell University Press.

External links
Documentary Is Never Neutral
Cinema Politica

 
Cinema